William Dixon Allott (1 May 1817 – 19 November 1892) was Mayor of Adelaide 1873–1874.

Allott was born in Walsall, Staffordshire, England, the son of a minister. He was first apprenticed to a druggist and later was a member of the Pharmaceutical Society of Great Britain. He arrived in South Australia in 1854, working as a chemist and druggist. Allott was the 18th mayor of Adelaide.

He died in Knightsbridge, South Australia in 1892.

References

1817 births
1892 deaths
People from Walsall
English emigrants to colonial Australia
Mayors and Lord Mayors of Adelaide
19th-century Australian politicians